The Ocean Blue is the debut studio album by American indie pop band the Ocean Blue, released in 1989 by record labels Sire and Reprise.

Composition 
The song "Vanity Fair" references The Pilgrim's Progress.

Reception 

In a retrospective review for AllMusic, Nitsuh Abebe wrote, "While its songwriting occasionally falters, and it lacks the sonic cohesion of its two successors, The Ocean Blue delivers on what makes all of the band's work so appealing: simple, beautiful hooks and melodies."

The album peaked at No. 155 on the Billboard 200.

Track listing

Personnel 

The Ocean Blue
 David Schelzel – vocals, guitars
 Steve Lau – keyboards, saxophone, vocals
 Bobby Mittan – bass guitar
 Rob Minnig – drums

Production
 Mike Dignam – engineer
 Mark Opitz – mixing
 Bob Ludwig – mastering

References

External links 
 
 http://www.theoceanblue.com/self-titled

1989 debut albums
Albums produced by John Porter (musician)
Albums produced by Mark Opitz
Reprise Records albums
Sire Records albums